Pavel Zdunov is a Russian professional ice hockey forward who is currently playing for Humo Tashkent in the Supreme Hockey League (VHL).

Playing career
Zdunov formerly played with Metallurg Magnitogorsk, making his KHL debut in the 2010–11 season. He appeared in an impressive 41 games as a 20-year-old, registering 6 points, before securing a regular role in the post-season, with 3 points in 15 games. Zdunov's season was recognised as he was awarded the Alexei Cherepanov Trophy as the best rookie.

During the 2013–14 season, after making 7 appearances with Magnitogorsk, Zdunov was traded to HC Neftekhimik Nizhnekamsk in exchange for Oskar Osala, on December 10, 2013.

Career statistics

Awards and honours

References

External links

1991 births
Living people
Metallurg Magnitogorsk players
HC Neftekhimik Nizhnekamsk players
Russian ice hockey forwards